Dato' Syed Esa bin Alwee was a Malaysian politician. He was a prominent Malay leader during the British colonial period and the subsequent struggle for independence. He became the second Speaker of the Dewan Rakyat, the lower house of the Malaysian Parliament in 1964.

Syed Esa was also a Scout, and was Chief Commissioner of Scouts, the administrative head of the Malaysian Scouting Association, from 1963 to 1968.

Biography
He received his secondary education at English College Johore Bahru.
Syed Esa was vice-president of the Peninsular Malay Movement, Johor branch (PMSJ) which organised a historic rally against the Malayan Union in Batu Pahat on 12 February 1946. After independence, he served as Member of Parliament for Batu Pahat Dalam, and was elected Speaker of the Dewan Rakyat in May 1964. He stepped down from the role in November that year, and became Deputy Speaker until 1969.

References

Year of birth missing
People from Johor
Malaysian people of Malay descent
Malaysian Muslims
Speakers of the Dewan Rakyat
United Malays National Organisation politicians
Members of the Dewan Rakyat
Malaysian people of Yemeni descent
Hadhrami people
Year of death missing
Companions of the Order of the Defender of the Realm